Ethopia may refer 
 A misspelling of Ethiopia, the country in Africa
 Ethopia (moth), a genus of moths